This is a list of listed buildings in the parish of Inverkip in Inverclyde, Scotland (covering the villages of Inverkip and Wemyss Bay as well as the westernmost parts of Gourock and Greenock).

List 

|}

Key

See also 
 List of listed buildings in Inverclyde

Notes

References
 All entries, addresses and coordinates are based on data from Historic Scotland. This data falls under the Open Government Licence

Inverkip